The 2002 Hungarian Figure Skating Championships were the national championships of the 2001–02 figure skating season. Skaters competed in the disciplines of men's singles, ladies' singles, and ice dancing on the senior level. The results were used to choose the Hungarian teams to the 2002 Winter Olympics, the 2002 World Championships, and the 2002 European Championships.

Results

Men

Ladies

Ice dancing

External links
 results

Hungarian Figure Skating Championships
Hungarian Figure Skating Championships, 2002
Figure skating